Forbes compiles the finances of all 30 MLB teams to produce an annual ranking of the best franchises in terms of valuation. The valuations are composed of the monetary worth of the sport, market, stadium deals, and brand. These areas are supported by applying financial metrics such as debt and operating income to each one.

The latest ranking reported that the New York Yankees is the most valuable MLB franchise after the 2021 MLB season. The fastest growing MLB franchise is the New York Yankees as well, with a 50% increase in valuation since the 2017 MLB season ($4 to $6 billion). The Yankees have held the crown for the most valuable MLB franchise since the inaugural ranking, which was released after the 1998 MLB season.

Several media outlets have referenced in related news or conducts analytic journalism when the ranking comes out, such as USA Today  and Yahoo!. The MLB has recognized the renditions of the ranking in financial documents, although not publicly. The report has also applied more context to MLB trends, such as the root of the 2021–22 MLB lockout being that owners were getting more money while players/employees were getting less despite growing valuations. This was further illustrated by the next edition of the ranking after the lockout, where nearly every MLB franchise has been growing, although the MLB is decidedly the slowest among the "Big Four" leagues along with the MLS.

Ranking
Rankings as of March 24, 2022 (2021 MLB season)

Composition

Historical valuations

Notes

See also

 Forbes' list of the most valuable sports teams
 List of professional sports leagues by revenue

References

Major League Baseball teams
Sports world rankings
Top sports lists
Forbes lists
21st century-related lists